James Metcalfe (1822 – September 13, 1886) was an Ontario businessman and political figure.  He represented York East in the House of Commons of Canada as a Liberal member from 1867 to 1878.

He was born in Cumberland, England in 1822, the son of James Metcalfe and Anne Finlinson, and was educated in Manchester. He studied architecture with his father there.  In 1841, Metcalfe emigrated to Upper Canada and worked as a building contractor in Toronto.  In 1843, he married Ellen Howson. In 1851, he went to Australia, again working as a contractor builder in Melbourne, where he built several public buildings.  He returned to Toronto in 1858 and later served as vice-president of the Royal Canadian Bank.

Metcalfe was involved in the construction of St.James Cathedral, Trinity College-University of Toronto, St. Lawrence Hall, and Toronto's first Post Office. In Australia, he helped to construct the original Parliament Buildings in Melbourne.

Metcalfe died in Toronto at the age of 64 and was buried in Mount Pleasant Cemetery.

References 

1822 births
1886 deaths
Liberal Party of Canada MPs
Members of the House of Commons of Canada from Ontario
English emigrants to pre-Confederation Ontario